The 1950 Rutgers Scarlet Knights baseball team is a baseball team that represented Rutgers University in the 1950 NCAA baseball season. They were led by first-year head coach George Case.

The Scarlet Knights finished third in the College World Series, defeated by the Texas Longhorns.

Roster

Schedule 

! style="" | Regular Season
|- valign="top" 

|- align="center" bgcolor="#ccffcc"
| 1 || March 27 || at  || Unknown • College Park, Maryland || 10–0 || 1–0
|- align="center" bgcolor="#ffcccc"
| 2 || March 28 || at Maryland || Unknown • College Park, Maryland || 7–10 || 1–1
|- align="center" bgcolor="#ccffcc"
| 3 || March 29 || at  || Unknown • Charlottesville, Virginia || 3–2 || 2–1
|- align="center" bgcolor="#bbbbbb"
| 4 || March 31 || at  || Unknown • Lexington, Virginia || 6–6 || 2–1–1
|-

|- align="center" bgcolor="#ccffcc"
| 5 || April 1 || at  || Unknown • Washington, D.C. || 4–3 || 3–1–1
|- align="center" bgcolor="#ccffcc"
| 6 || April 8 ||  || Unknown • Piscataway, New Jersey || 11–5 || 4–1–1
|- align="center" bgcolor="#ccffcc"
| 7 || April 10 || at  || Unknown • Washington, D.C. || 4–3 || 5–1–1
|- align="center" bgcolor="#ccffcc"
| 8 || April 12 ||  || Unknown • Piscataway, New Jersey || 11–4 || 6–1–1
|- align="center" bgcolor="#ccffcc"
| 9 || April 15 || at  || Unknown • State College, Pennsylvania || 6–3 || 7–1–1
|- align="center" bgcolor="#ccffcc"
| 10 || April 19 ||  || Unknown • Piscataway, New Jersey || 15–0 || 8–1–1
|- align="center" bgcolor="#ffcccc"
| 11 || April 21 || Colgate || Unknown • Piscataway, New Jersey || 6–7 || 8–2–1
|- align="center" bgcolor="#ccffcc"
| 12 || April 22 ||  || Unknown • Piscataway, New Jersey || 12–5 || 9–2–1
|- align="center" bgcolor="#ccffcc"
| 13 || April 29 ||  || Unknown • Piscataway, New Jersey || 14–12 || 10–2–1
|-

|- align="center" bgcolor="#ccffcc"
| 14 || May 4 || at  || Unknown • New York, New York || 10–2 || 11–2–1
|- align="center" bgcolor="#ccffcc"
| 15 || May 6 ||  || Unknown • Piscataway, New Jersey || 12–0 || 12–2–1
|- align="center" bgcolor="#ccffcc"
| 16 || May 8 ||  || Unknown • Piscataway, New Jersey || 11–5 || 13–2–1
|- align="center" bgcolor="#ccffcc"
| 17 || May 10 ||  || Unknown • Piscataway, New Jersey || 12–2 || 14–2–1
|- align="center" bgcolor="#ccffcc"
| 18 || May 17 || at Lehigh || Unknown • Bethlehem, Pennsylvania || 17–4 || 15–2–1
|- align="center" bgcolor="#ccffcc"
| 19 || May 20 || Lafayette || Unknown • Piscataway, New Jersey || 9–8 || 16–2–1
|- align="center" bgcolor="#ffcccc"
| 20 || May 27 || at Princeton || Unknown • Princeton, New Jersey || 2–3 || 16–3–1
|-

|- align="center" bgcolor="#ffcccc"
| 21 || June 5 ||  || Unknown • Piscataway, New Jersey || 3–13 || 16–4–1
|- align="center" bgcolor="#ccffcc"
| 22 || June 10 || Virginia || Unknown • Piscataway, New Jersey || 10–8 || 17–4–1
|-

|-
! style="" | Postseason
|- valign="top"

|- align="center" bgcolor="#ccffcc"
| 23 || June 15 || vs Texas || Johnny Rosenblatt Stadium • Omaha, Nebraska || 4–2 || 18–4–1
|- align="center" bgcolor="#ccffcc"
| 24 || June 17 || vs Wisconsin || Johnny Rosenblatt Stadium • Omaha, Nebraska || 5–3 || 19–4–1
|- align="center" bgcolor="#ffcccc"
| 25 || June 19 || vs Washington State || Johnny Rosenblatt Stadium • Omaha, Nebraska || 1–3 || 19–5–1
|- align="center" bgcolor="#ccffcc"
| 26 || June 21 || vs Wisconsin || Johnny Rosenblatt Stadium • Omaha, Nebraska || 16–2 || 20–5–1
|- align="center" bgcolor="#ffcccc"
| 27 || June 22 || vs Texas || Johnny Rosenblatt Stadium • Omaha, Nebraska || 9–15 || 20–6–1
|-

References 

Rutgers Scarlet Knights baseball seasons
Rutgers Scarlet Knights baseball
College World Series seasons
Rutgers